Alfred Miller may refer to:

Alfred Henry Miller, American football player
Alfred Jacob Miller, painter
Alf Miller (1917–1999), English footballer, mostly played for Southport and Plymouth Argyle 
Alfred Douglas Miller (1864–1933), British army officer

See also
Alf Millar, Australian rules footballer 
Al Miller (disambiguation)